June Alexandra Croft (born 17 June 1963) is an English former freestyle swimmer.

Swimming career
Croft represented Great Britain at three consecutive Summer Olympics, starting in 1980. At her Olympic debut in Moscow, she won the silver medal in the women's 4×100-metre medley relay, followed by the bronze medal in the women's 400-metre freestyle four years later at the 1984 Summer Olympics in Los Angeles.

She represented England and won five medals at the 1982 Commonwealth Games in Brisbane, Queensland, Australia; triple gold in the 100 and 200 metres freestyle and 4x100 metres relay, a silver in the medley relay and a bronze in the 4x200 metres freestyle relay. Eight years later she represented England and won a silver and bronze in the freestyle relays events, at the 1990 Commonwealth Games in Auckland, New Zealand.

She is a four times consecutive winner of the ASA National British Championships title over 100 metres freestyle (1980–1983), twice the 200 metres freestyle champion in 1982 and 1983, the 400 metres freestyle champion in 1982 and the 200 metres medley champion in 1982.

See also
 List of Olympic medalists in swimming (women)
 List of Commonwealth Games medallists in swimming (women)

References

 British Olympic Committee
 

1963 births
Living people
People from Ashton-in-Makerfield
English female freestyle swimmers
English female swimmers
Olympic swimmers of Great Britain
Swimmers at the 1980 Summer Olympics
Swimmers at the 1984 Summer Olympics
Swimmers at the 1988 Summer Olympics
Swimmers at the 1982 Commonwealth Games
Swimmers at the 1990 Commonwealth Games
Olympic bronze medalists in swimming
Medalists at the 1980 Summer Olympics
Medalists at the 1984 Summer Olympics
English Olympic medallists
Olympic silver medallists for Great Britain
Olympic bronze medallists for Great Britain
Commonwealth Games gold medallists for England
Commonwealth Games silver medallists for England
Commonwealth Games bronze medallists for England
Olympic silver medalists in swimming
Commonwealth Games medallists in swimming
Medallists at the 1982 Commonwealth Games
Medallists at the 1990 Commonwealth Games